Luis Felipe Carvalho Da Silva (born 18 September 1993) is a Uruguayan football player, who plays as a centre-back.

He played in several Brazilian youth teams, including Internacional. After a stint with the amateur team of Peñarol de Rivera and another one with the Tacuarembó in the Uruguayan Primera División, he was discovered by the Norwegian scout Terje Liverød who is based in Uruguay and brought Carvalho to the Swedish champions Malmö FF for whom he signed on 11 July 2015.

Career statistics

Honours

Malmö FF
 Allsvenskan: 2016, 2017
Nacional
 Uruguayan Primera División: 2019

References

External links
 
 Malmö FF profile 
 

1993 births
Living people
People from Rivera Department
Uruguayan footballers
Uruguayan expatriate footballers
Uruguayan people of Brazilian descent
Association football defenders
Tacuarembó F.C. players
Club Nacional de Football players
Malmö FF players
Vålerenga Fotball players
Club Atlético River Plate (Montevideo) players
Club Bolívar players
Uruguayan Primera División players
Allsvenskan players
Eliteserien players
Uruguayan expatriate sportspeople in Sweden
Uruguayan expatriate sportspeople in Norway
Uruguayan expatriate sportspeople in Bolivia
Expatriate footballers in Sweden
Expatriate footballers in Norway
Expatriate footballers in Bolivia